Bigu is a former village development committee that is now a ward-7 rural municipality in Dolakha District in Bagmati Province of northeastern Nepal. At the 1991 Nepal census, Bigu had a population of 1,736 people living in 361 individual households.

The epicenter of the May 2015 Nepal earthquake was located in Bigu.

References

External links
UN map of the municipalities of Dolakha District
Bigu's website

Populated places in Dolakha District
Rural municipalities in Dolakha District